A United States military "jury" (or "members", in military parlance) serves a function similar to an American civilian jury, but with several notable differences. Only a general court-martial (which may impose any sentences, from dishonorable discharge to death) or special court-martial (which can impose sentences of up to one year of confinement and bad-conduct discharge) includes members.  There are no members in a trial by summary court-martial (which can impose sentences of up to 30 days of confinement).  If the defendant at a general or special court-martial chooses to be tried by members rather than by a military judge alone, the members are responsible for rendering both a verdict and sentence should the accused be found guilty.  The charges are brought forward by an officer called a "convening authority", who also selects the members who try the accused.  The charges are prosecuted by judge advocates called "trial counsel".  Defendants facing general or special courts-martial are represented free of charge from judge advocates acting as defense counsel.  Defendants may also be represented at general or special courts-martial by civilian attorneys hired at their own expense.  While not required by Congressional law, service policy provides that, at summary courts-martial, many military accused receive representation from a judge advocate defense counsel free of charge.

Mechanics

Jury composition
A special court-martial must have at least three members. A general court-martial must have at least five members unless the death penalty is a mandatory sentence, in which case there must be at least 12 members. The convening authority may detail as many members to a court-martial as he or she chooses so long as the minimum number is met. The convening authority chooses "such members of the armed forces as, in his [or her] opinion, are best qualified for the duty by reason of age, education, training, experience, length of service, and judicial temperament."

If the defendant is a commissioned officer, all of the members must also be commissioned officers. If the defendant is a warrant officer, the members may be either commissioned officers or warrant officers. If the defendant is an enlisted member of the armed forces, the members may be commissioned officers, warrant officers, and, if the defendant requests it, enlisted members. If an enlisted defendant requests to be tried by a panel that includes enlisted members, at least one-third of the members must be enlisted. All members of the court-martial are required to be senior or equal in rank to the defendant.

Verdicts
The members vote by secret written ballot on each of the allegations the accused person faces, with each member having one vote on each charge.  Unlike most civilian jurisdictions, a unanimous verdict is not required in most cases.  Unless the death penalty is mandatory for the offense in question, the members may convict by a two-thirds majority.  If the death penalty is mandatory if convicted, then the members must be unanimous in their verdict. As such, military juries are incapable of being a hung jury.

See also
 Uniform Code of Military Justice
 Military law
 Courts-martial in the United States

References

External links
 U.S. News & World Report: Unequal Justice
 U.S. News & World Report: Creating a Code of Justice
 Dart Center: Injustice & the Military
 The Seven Basic Myths About Military Justice
 U.S. Army Judge Advocate General's Corps

United States military law